Coagulation factor XII, also known as  Hageman factor, is a plasma protein. It is the zymogen form of factor XIIa, an enzyme of the serine protease (or serine endopeptidase) class.  In humans, factor XII is encoded by the F12 gene.

Structure 

Human Factor XII is 596 amino acids long and consists of two chains, the heavy chain (353 residues) and light chain (243 residues) held together by a disulfide bond. It is 80,000 daltons. Its heavy chain contains two fibronectin-type domains (type I and II), two epidermal growth factor-like domains, a kringle domain, and a proline-rich region, and its light chain contains the protease domain. The structure of the FnI-EGF-like tandem domain of coagulation factor XII has been solved by X-ray crystallography.
Crystal structures of the FXII light chain has also been determined unbound (β-FXII) and bound (β-FXIIa) to inhibitors.

Factor XII (FXII, Hageman factor) is a plasma glycoprotein of approximately 90 kDa molecular weight is part of the coagulation cascade and activates factor XI and prekallikrein in vitro. Factor XII itself is activated to factor XIIa by negatively charged surfaces, such as glass. This is the starting point of the intrinsic pathway. Factor XII can also be used to start coagulation cascades in laboratory diagnostic coagulation assays called activated partial thromboplastin times (aPTT).

In vivo, factor XII is activated by binding (contact) to polyanions termed contact-activation. Multiple polymers, the white clay material kaolin and glass are non-physiological factor XII contact activators. Activated platelets release inorganic polymers, polyphosphates. Contact to polyphosphates activates factor XII and initiates fibrin formation by the intrinsic pathway of coagulation with critical importance for thrombus formation and the factor XII-activated pro inflammatory kallikrein kinin-system. Targeting polyphosphates with phosphatases interfered with procoagulant activity of activated platelets and blocked platelet-induced thrombosis in mice. Addition of polyphosphates restored defective plasma clotting of Hermansky–Pudlak syndrome patients, indicating that the inorganic polymer is the endogenous factor XII activator in vivo. Platelet polyphosphate-driven factor XII activation provides the link from primary hemostasis (formation of a platelet plug) to secondary hemostasis (fibrin meshwork formation).  Polyphosphate exerts differential effects on plasma clotting in test tubes ex vivo, depending on polymer size and it was shown in vitro that platelet-size soluble polyphosphates induce little activaton of factor XII in solution but that they are accelerators of thrombin-induced activation of factor XI. The mystery was solved upon the discovery that short chain polyphosphate forms insoluble calcium-rich nanoparticles in vivo. These aggregates accumulate on the platelet surface and activate factor XII independently of the chain length go the individual polymer. Regulation of polyphosphates in platelets has remained poorly understood. Combinations of systems biology, genetics and functional analyses has identified the phosphate-exporter XPR1 as important regulator of polyphosphates in platelets. Targeting XPR1 increases polyphosphate content and leads to accelerated arterial and venous thrombosis in mouse models.

Based on the seminar role of factor XII in thrombosis while sparing haemostats, targeting the protease has emerged as a promising drug traget for safe anticoagulant drugs that in contrast to currently used anticoagulants, do not increase bleeding. Multiple factor XII inhibitors have been developed and some of them are in clinical trials

Genetics 

The gene for factor XII is located on the tip of the long arm of the fifth chromosome (5q33-qter).

Role in disease 

Factor XII deficiency is a rare disorder that is inherited in an autosomal recessive manner. Unlike other clotting factor deficiencies, factor XII deficiency is totally asymptomatic and does not cause excess bleeding. Mice lacking the gene for factor XII, however, are less susceptible to thrombosis. The protein seems to be involved in the later stages of clot formation rather than the first occlusion of damages in the blood vessel wall.

Factor XII does play an important role in clot formation during in vitro measurements of the partial thromboplastin time, which causes these measurements to be markedly prolonged in patients with factor XII deficiency, usually well beyond even what is seen in hemophilia A, hemophilia B, or factor XI deficiency. As a result, the main concern related to factor XII deficiency is the unnecessary testing, delay in care, worry, etc. that may be prompted by the abnormal lab result. All of this, including the mechanism of inheritance, also holds true for the other contact factors, prekallikrein (Fletcher factor) and high molecular weight kininogen.

Excess levels of factor XII can predispose individuals towards greater risk of venous thrombosis due to factor XII's role as one of the catalysts for conversion of plasminogen to its active fibrinolytic form of plasmin.

Factor XII is also activated by endotoxins, especially lipid A in vitro.

Experimental mouse models have suggested a role of FXII in multiple sclerosis.

History 

Hageman factor was first discovered in 1955 when a routine preoperative blood sample of the 37-year-old railroad brakeman John Hageman (1918) was found to have prolonged clotting time in test tubes, even though he had no hemorrhagic symptoms. Hageman was then examined by hematologist Oscar Ratnoff, who found that Hageman lacked a previously unidentified clotting factor. Ratnoff later found that the Hageman factor deficiency is an autosomal recessive disorder, after examining several related people who had the deficiency. Paradoxically, pulmonary embolism contributed to Hageman's death after an occupational accident in 1968. Since then, case studies and clinical studies identified an association between thrombosis and Factor XII deficiency. Hepatocytes express blood coagulation factor XII.

Currently produced QuikClot products, produced and marketed primarily for use in battlefield medicine to treat penetrating trauma (such as gunshot wounds and stab wounds), and other injuries that are known to commonly cause exsanguination (such as blast injury), are used with the overarching goal of increasing the time between the blood loss occurring, and the patient succumbing to the blood loss. The purpose of increasing this time is so that the patient may reaching a higher level of medical care before succumbing from their injuries. These products use a Kaolinite-based coating, applied to the bandages by the manufacturer before packaging and sale. This coating, when applied to an open wound via the application of the bandages, directly promotes blood clotting by activating Factor XII in the coagulation cascade. Also, due to the active ingredient nature of Kaolinite, the activation of the Factor XII occurs in both an earlier amount of time than it otherwise would, and at an increased, more rapid rate than it otherwise would. This coating is widely considered amongst combat medics to be vastly superior to the older QuikClot powder formulation, which was poured into wounds, due to the fact that the older formulation used bead-form Zeolite, a mineral which promotes the coagulation cascade, due to the fact that the reaction between the Zeolite powder and the blood inside the wound site was an Exothermic one, sometimes so intensely that it caused cases of second degree burns on the inside surface of the wound. This, obviously, caused extreme pain to the patient, often more-so than the initial injury was causing them at the time (assuming the patient was still conscious at the time of the application of the powder). This effect is often seen in movies and TV programs, with the QuikClot powder being poured into wounds, and the patient screaming out in pain as their wounds were violently burned on the inside surface of the wounds. This created a common misconception, which persists to this day, that commonly used QuikClot products still use this method of clot promotion (Zeolite powder) to this day. However, Zeolite-based clotting products are no longer widely used by militaries and police departments throughout the western world, as they have been widely supplanted by the Kaolinite-based bandage products, which do not cause any exothermic reaction whatsoever, nor do they have the absolute-requirement of the application of the product exclusively to the inside-surface of the wound.

References

Further reading

External links 
 The MEROPS online database for peptidases and their inhibitors: S01.211
 
 

Coagulation system
EC 3.4.21
Zymogens